|}

The Arran Scottish Fillies' Sprint Stakes is a Listed flat horse race in Great Britain open to mares and fillies aged three years or older.
It is run at Ayr over a distance of 5 furlongs and 110 yards (1,106 metres), and it is scheduled to take place each year in September.  It is currently held on the second day of Ayr's three-day Ayr Gold Cup Festival (previously the Western Meeting).

The race was introduced as a new Listed race in 2017 but the scheduled first running was abandoned due to waterlogging. The race was rescheduled and run at Musselburgh in October over the slightly shorter distance of 5 furlongs.

Records
Most successful horse:
 No horse has won this race more than once

Leading jockey (2 wins):
 Ben Curtis – Lady In France (2019), Dandalla (2021)

Leading trainer (3 wins):
 Michael Dods – Mabs Cross (2017), Intense Romance (2018), Gale Force Maya (2022)

Winners

 The 2017 running took place in October at Musselburgh after the Ayr Gold Cup meeting was abandoned because of waterlogging.

References 

Racing Post:

Flat races in Great Britain
Ayr Racecourse
Sprint category horse races for fillies and mares
Recurring sporting events established in 2017
2017 establishments in Scotland